Andhara Tharhi is a village in Andhra Tharhi Block, Madhubani District, Bihar state, India. It is the seat of the eponymous Vidhan Sabha constituency. Its name comes from Andhra Thora, or the King of Andhra stays here. Andhra Tharhi is located 20 km from Jhanjharpur and approximately 35 km from Madhubani. The nearest railway station is Vachaspati Nagar.

References

Cities and towns in Madhubani district